Kirils Stucka (Kirill Andreevich Stutzka; 14 May 1890 – 17 January 1938) was officer of Latvian Riflemen, later Soviet komkor. 

He was born Stāmeriena Parish, Governorate of Livonia. Stucka fought in the 3rd Courland Latvian Riflemen Regiment of the Imperial Russian Army in World War I before going over to the Bolsheviks in the subsequent civil war. He was a recipient of the Order of the Red Banner. 

During the Great Purge, as a part of the so-called "Latvian Operation", Stucka was arrested on November 29, 1937 and later executed and buried at the Levashovo Memorial Cemetery. After the death of Joseph Stalin, he was rehabilitated in 1956.

Bibliography

Sources
 КОМКОР 55. Стуцка Кирилл Андреевич
 СПИСОК ГРАЖДАН, РАССТРЕЛЯННЫХ В ЛЕНИНГРАДЕ, ВНЕ ЛЕНИНГРАДА И ВПОСЛЕДСТВИИ РЕАБИЛИТИРОВАННЫХ (ТОМ 8 «ЛМ»)
1890 births
1938 deaths
People from Gulbene Municipality
Russian military personnel of World War I
Soviet military personnel of the Russian Civil War
Latvian Riflemen
Stutzka
Recipients of the Order of the Red Banner
Great Purge victims from Latvia
People executed by the Soviet Union by firearm
Soviet rehabilitations